Manzoor Ahmed (born 2 January 1992) is a Pakistani retired international footballer who played as a defender. He is the secretary of sports in the Pakistani province of Balochistan.

Ahmed earned his first international cap in 2011, coming in a March friendly against Palestine.

References

1992 births
Living people
Pakistani footballers
Footballers from Quetta
Association football defenders
WAPDA F.C. players
Afghan FC Chaman players
Pakistan international footballers